Piet van der Hem (9 September 1885 – 24 April 1961) was a Dutch painter, cartoonist, and illustrator. His work was part of the art competitions at the 1924 Summer Olympics, the 1932 Summer Olympics, and the 1936 Summer Olympics.

References

1885 births
1961 deaths
19th-century Dutch painters
20th-century Dutch painters
Dutch male painters
Olympic competitors in art competitions
People from Leeuwarden
19th-century Dutch male artists
20th-century Dutch male artists